Hoffa may refer to:

Film
Hoffa (film), a 1992 biographical film about labor leader Jimmy Hoffa

People 
Rafael Araújo (basketball), Brazilian NBA basketball player, nicknamed Hoffa
Albert Hoffa (1859–1907), German orthopaedic surgeon
James P. Hoffa (born 1941), son of Jimmy Hoffa, former leader of the Teamsters Union
Jimmy Hoffa (1913–1975), former leader of the Teamsters Union and author
Portland Hoffa (1905–1990), American comedian, actor, and dancer
Reese Hoffa (born 1977), American shot-putter

Other uses 
Hoffa fracture

See also

 Hofer (disambiguation)
 Höfer, a surname
 Hoffer, a surname